Joseph Danner Taylor (November 7, 1830 – September 19, 1899) was an American lawyer and politician who served as a U.S. Representative from Ohio, serving four full terms and part of a fifth in the late 19th century.

Biography

Joseph D. Taylor was born in Goshen Township, in Belmont County, Ohio. Taylor attended public schools in Belmont County and later attended Madison College at Antrim, obtaining a teaching degree.

Taylor taught in Fairview High School from 1854 to 1856, and became principal in 1857. He sought a new revenue for his talents and was accepted at Cincinnati Law School, now known as the University of Cincinnati College of Law, where he obtained his LL.B. in 1860. He was admitted to the bar in 1859.

Taylor was impressed by his time in Guernsey County that he bought property in Cambridge and lived in a simple wood-frame home on Wheeling Avenue. He would later construct his elegant Queen Anne Style home in 1878 on Upland Drive and constructed the Berwick Hotel on the site of the house on Wheeling Avenue. In 1860 he opened his law practice and in 1861 started the Guernsey Times Newspaper. He would remain owner until 1871. Taylor rose in prominence as he made a name for himself in the courts as well as his newspaper articles. Leading up to the Civil War, Taylor ran articles denouncing slavery and called for negotiation to eliminate the practice.

Military service
Joining the Union Army during the Civil War he entered as a captain in the 88th Ohio Infantry. Taylor became a judge advocate from 1863 until 1865, when hostilities between the states ended. Taylor also served as a prosecuting attorney for Guernsey County from 1863 to 1866.

Political service
Taylor soon turned to the public welfare by entering politics. He served as delegate to the National Union Convention in 1866, joined the Cambridge School Board from 1870 to 1877, and even served as a delegate to the Republican National Conventions in 1876 and 1880.

Taylor was elected as a Republican to the Forty-seventh Congress to fill the vacancy caused by the death of Jonathan T. Updegraff. During his reelection he was voted into the Forty-eighth Congress and served until 1885, when he lost another reelection bid. This setback did not stop him as he campaigned and won his bid to the Fiftieth, Fifty-first, and Fifty-second Congresses and served from March 4, 1887, until March 3, 1893.

Taylor retired from politics but remained an influential force in the development and growth of Guernsey County and Cambridge in particular. He died in Cambridge, Ohio, September 19, 1899, and was interred in the South Cemetery.

References
 Retrieved on 2008-10-18

External links

1830 births
1899 deaths
People from Cambridge, Ohio
Union Army officers
Ohio lawyers
People from Belmont County, Ohio
University of Cincinnati College of Law alumni
County district attorneys in Ohio
19th-century American politicians
19th-century American lawyers
Republican Party members of the United States House of Representatives from Ohio